Aziz Qureshi (born 24 April 1941) is an Indian politician and a senior Indian National Congress leader of mixed Arab-Pathan Muslim ethnoreligious and Urdu-speaking linguistic background from Bhopal, Madhya Pradesh.

He had previously served as 15th Governor of Mizoram from January to March 2015. In addition, he also previously served as the Governor of Uttarakhand from 2012 to 2015 and was also appointed Governor of Uttar Pradesh (additional charge) for a month in 2014, before Ram Naik took over his position. 

Later, he was appointed chairman of the Madhya Pradesh Urdu Academy on 24 January 2020 by the Government of Madhya Pradesh, after leaving the state governorships post.

In 1973, he served as a cabinet minister in Madhya Pradesh and later in 1984, he was elected to Lok Sabha from Satna (Madhya Pradesh) constituency for a term until 1989.

References

|-

|-

|-

1941 births
Indian National Congress politicians from Madhya Pradesh
Living people
Indian Muslims
Governors of Uttarakhand
India MPs 1984–1989
Lok Sabha members from Madhya Pradesh
Indian people of Pashtun descent
Governors of Uttar Pradesh
Indian Sunni Muslims
Governors of Mizoram
Indian people of Arab descent
Dr. Bhimrao Ambedkar University alumni
Politicians from Bhopal